Cotycuara albomarginata is a species of beetle in the family Cerambycidae. It was described by Galileo and Martins in 2004. It is known from Costa Rica and Panama.

References

Hemilophini
Beetles described in 2004